Eivind Henriksen (born 14 September 1990) is a Norwegian athlete. He was born in Oslo. Henriksen won the silver medal at the 2020 Summer Olympics in the hammer throw event, and also qualified for and competed at the 2012 Summer Olympics in London. Among other significant results, Henriksen placed sixth at the 2019 World Championships and fifth at the 2018 European Championships.

His personal best (also the Norwegian record in the hammer throw) is 81.58 metres, set in 2021 at the Olympic Games in Tokyo.

Competition record

References

External links

 
 
 
 
 

Norwegian male hammer throwers
1990 births
Living people
Athletes from Oslo
Athletes (track and field) at the 2012 Summer Olympics
Olympic athletes of Norway
Norwegian Athletics Championships winners
World Athletics Championships athletes for  Norway
Athletes (track and field) at the 2020 Summer Olympics
Medalists at the 2020 Summer Olympics
Olympic silver medalists for Norway
Olympic silver medalists in athletics (track and field)
20th-century Norwegian people
21st-century Norwegian people
European Athletics Championships medalists